Lowman is a hamlet of the towns of Ashland and Chemung in Chemung County, New York, United States. The zipcode is: 14861.

The Riverside Cemetery was listed on the National Register of Historic Places in 2012.

References

Hamlets in New York (state)
Hamlets in Chemung County, New York